Reagan High School may refer to:
 John H. Reagan High School (Austin, Texas)
 Heights High School (formerly John H. Reagan High School) (Houston, Texas)

See also
For schools named after Ronald Reagan:
 Ronald Reagan High School (disambiguation)